The Children's Museum Jordan (Arabic: متحف الاطفال - الأردن) is a children's museum in Amman, Jordan. It is part of Al Hussein Public Parks.

History
The museum was launched by Queen Rania Al Abdullah in 2007. It is a member of the Association of Children's Museums and Hands On International.

In 2012, the Mobile Museum was launched, targeting children and families living all around Jordan, with the aim of extending the Children's Museum's learning experiences.

References

External links

Jordan
Museums established in 2007
2007 establishments in Jordan
Museums in Amman
Child-related organisations in Jordan